The Merchant Navy Welfare Board is a registered charity located in Southampton, England, that acts as the welfare umbrella for the United Kingdom Merchant Navy and fishing fleet charity sector. Its mission statement is "Supporting the provision of quality welfare services for seafarers and their dependants."

The Board's key objectives are to:
	Help improve the effectiveness of all those charities caring for merchant seafarers, fishermen and their dependants and this is done irrespective of nationality, religion or ethnic background.
	Strive to ensure that all welfare needs are met through the most effective deployment of resources.
	Facilitate the work of Constituent organisations through the provision of grants and specialist support services.
	Provide a dedicated welfare support and referral service for UK seafarers and their dependants.
	Manage and support Port Welfare Committees to develop local welfare services.
	Encourage and enable closer collaboration amongst both Constituent organisations and Port Welfare Committees. 
	Represent and raise awareness of seafarers' welfare issues at national level.

The benefits of National Seafarers' Welfare Boards and Port Welfare Committees are enshrined within the International Labour Organization's (ILO) Maritime Labour Convention 2006, Regulation 4.4. The Board is the world's oldest established Seafarers' Welfare Board and the ILO has used it as a template for the appropriate parts of this Convention. Today the Board has over 40 member organisations subscribing to its Constitution, with which it works in close collaboration to provide support services.
There are also fifteen Port Welfare Committees (PWCs) within the UK with another in Gibraltar. The PWCs are strategic partnerships dealing with local seafarers' welfare issues, needs, projects and grant funding. Membership is open to all organisations directly concerned with the welfare of seafarers.

Council
The Board's Council (the directors) consists of trustees appointed by the ship owners or ship managers (via the UK Chamber of Shipping), the two UK maritime trade unions (Nautilus International and National Union of Rail, Maritime and Transport Workers), the maritime charity sector and also persons able to make a particular contribution to the work of the charity.

Finance
The Board's primary source of funding is from investment income.  Whilst it does not proactively fundraise, it is always grateful for donations and legacies, which are used to enhance its work.

Principal Activities

Welfare Support
Welfare support is provided using the Board's unique and comprehensive knowledge of the UK maritime charity sector, together with a wide network of industry contacts.  It aims to place those, from a seafaring background and their families, who are seeking practical or financial assistance, in touch with maritime charities and other organisations best able to help. 
The Board also operates the Seafarer Support Helpline for the entire UK maritime charity sector - Merchant Navy, Royal Navy, Royal Marines and fishing fleet. This unique referral service is aimed at directing enquirers to maritime welfare organisations that are best suited to help in times of need.

Port Welfare Committees
The Board manages 16 Port Welfare Committees covering the entire United Kingdom coastline and also Gibraltar. These collaborative committees promote partnerships that co-ordinate and support welfare services for seafarers at a local level.

Grants
Whilst the Board does not provide grants to individuals, it regularly provides capital and start-up grants to its Constituent Member charities.

Courses
The Board provides a range of training packages for its Constituent and Port Welfare Committee members.

Projects
The Board undertakes numerous collaborative projects on behalf of its many Constituent Members.  These include evaluation and feasibility studies, databases of various aspects of the maritime charity sector, the award winning online Maritime Charities Welfare Guide and the Ports Welfare Vehicle Replacement Programme.

Publications and information
The Board publishes online and in hard copy: 
	Port Information Leaflets for the use of all seafarers visiting many UK ports and Gibraltar. 
	A practical guide for seafarers and their families dealing with loss of a close family member. 
	In preparation is a guide covering the responsibilities of the various organisations dealing with vessels that have been detained or arrested. This is aimed at matters that have an effect on crew welfare.

Collaboration with International Agencies
The Board's constitution allows it to support maritime welfare in the UK and Crown Dependencies.  As the longest established National Seafarers' Welfare Board it also collaborates, in an advisory capacity, with international agencies involved with seafarers' welfare.  
The Board has been contracted and funded, by the International Seafarers Welfare and Advice Network (ISWAN), to conduct a pilot project to encourage the establishment of welfare boards, in other parts of the world, in accordance with ILO's Maritime Labour Convention, 2006.

History
The Merchant Navy Welfare Board was established in 1948 following a review initiated, five years earlier, by the Government. As a consequence it took over and enhanced the role of its predecessor, the Seamen's Welfare Board which, in 1938, had taken over the work of the British Council for the Welfare of Merchantile Marine dating back to 1927.   
The membership of its Council, as now, came from ship owners, seafarers' trade unions and nautical charities, but also Government. Originally, funding was provided by the Government via levies imposed on British ship owners employing the many non-domiciled seamen. These companies were required to contribute the equivalent of the employer's national insurance contribution for each overseas seafarer they employed.  Fifty percent of the income was given to the Board, the remainder to another maritime charity.

At that time (1948) the Board inherited a number of hotels and clubs from the Seamen's Welfare Board, most of which were refurbished, although a few were sold. The Port Welfare Committees were also transferred and most charities caring for merchant seafarers and fishermen became Constituent members. Changes in merchant shipping and the reduction of the UK fleet from the 1970s onwards had a major impact on the need for hotels. Over a comparatively short period, all but one in central London became redundant, whilst the two remaining clubs were transferred to the seafarers' 'missions'. With the demise of the UK fleet Government support and direct involvement was also withdrawn. Fortuitously the sale of the hotels provided working capital that was invested to provide the primary income source for the Board's continuing work. In 2002, the Board took the view that the London hotel was no longer serving its original purpose and this was sold for redevelopment. The capital raised was added to its investment portfolio which greatly increased the Board's income.  This enabled it to provide much greater levels of support to its Constituent Members and indirectly, via them, to seafarers and their families. This includes the work outlined above.

The United Kingdom ratified the ILO's Maritime Labour Convention 2006 in August 2013.  The Maritime and Coastguard Agency, responsible for implementing this Convention in the UK, publicly recognises the importance of the Board's role within this. In turn the Board's Council sees its role, work and importance in supporting seafarers' welfare increasing in the future.

References

External links
Merchant Navy Welfare Board
Seafarer Support

Charities based in Hampshire
1948 establishments in the United Kingdom
Organizations established in 1948
British Merchant Navy
Fishing in the United Kingdom
Social welfare charities based in the United Kingdom